Constantin Ștefan (3 June 1939 – 12 September 2012) was a Romanian footballer who played as a left back.

Career
Constantin Ștefan was born on 3 June 1939 in Bucharest, Romania. He started his career playing at the junior squads of Voința București in 1953, starting his senior career in 1957 by playing two years at CPCS București in Divizia B and Divizia C. Afterwards, he went to play for Divizia B team, Dinamo Obor București for two seasons and a half, reaching the 1960 Cupa României Final which was lost with 2–0 in front of Progresul București. He made his Divizia A debut on 11 November 1961, playing for Dinamo București in a 4–1 away victory against Progresul, making a total of 16 appearances during his first season, as the club won the Divizia A title. In the following three seasons Ștefan helped the club win three more titles, in the first he played 25 games, in the second he made 19 appearances and in the last one he played in 22 matches. He also won two Cupa României and won another Divizia A title in the last season of his career in which he made 8 appearances, his last taking place on 20 June 1971 in a 2–2 against Universitatea Cluj. Ștefan played a total of 189 Divizia A matches and 11 games in European competitions, all for Dinamo București. Constantin Ștefan died on 12 September 2012 at age 73 in Bucharest.

Honours
Dinamo Obor București
Cupa României runner-up: 1959–60
Dinamo București
Divizia A: 1961–62, 1962–63, 1963–64, 1964–65, 1970–71
Cupa României: 1963–64, 1967–68

Notes

References

1939 births
2012 deaths
Romanian footballers
Association football defenders
Liga I players
Liga II players
Liga III players
Victoria București players
FC Dinamo București players
Footballers from Bucharest